WTLC-FM (106.7 MHz) is an urban adult contemporary radio station licensed to Greenwood, Indiana, serving the Indianapolis metropolitan area. Alongside sister stations WTLC, WHHH, WFNI, WIBC, WLHK, WYXB, and TV station WDNI-CD, WTLC-FM is owned and operated by Radio One.  All four stations and TV outlet share studios on Meridian Street in downtown Indianapolis and its transmitter tower is on the city's south side.

It is home to the Rickey Smiley Morning Show.

WTLC-FM is licensed to broadcast in the HD Radio format, but is not currently broadcasting in HD.

History
WTLC-FM had formerly aired on 105.7 FM under various monikers such as Soul Stereo FM 105 WTLC, WTLC 105 FM, Fresh 105 WTLC, Power 105 WTLC, 105.7 The People's Station, 105.7 The Power, Power 105.7 FM, and 105.7 WTLC, before the intellectual rights to the format - but not the frequency - were purchased from Emmis Communications by Radio One in January 2001. (See the WYXB page for WTLC's history at 105.7 before 2001.) Immediately prior to this switch, 106.7 FM operated under the call letters WBKS as an urban oldies station branded as "Kiss 106.7."

106.7 FM also held the call letters WVYJ and WGGR.

References

External links

African-American history of Indianapolis
Urban One stations
TLC-FM
Urban adult contemporary radio stations in the United States
Radio stations established in 1968
1968 establishments in Indiana
Mass media in Indianapolis